Aline Valangin was a Swiss writer, pianist, and psychoanalyst. She was follower of Carl Jung and became a psychoanalyst.

Together with Vladimir Rosenbaum (1894–1984, her husband from 1917 to 1940) in Comologno, she helped and played host to migrants as Ignazio Silone, Ernst Toller, and Kurt Tucholsky.

In 1931, she loved Silone when she read his masterpiece Fontamara and helped him to publish it.

Works
 Dictées (Gedichte), éditions Sagesse, Paris 1936
 Geschichten vom Tal, Girsberger, Zürich 1937
 L'Amande clandestine (Gedichte), éditions GLM, Paris 1939
 Tessiner Novellen, Girsberger, Zürich 1939
 Die Bargada. Eine Chronik, Büchergilde Gutenberg, Zürich 1940
 Casa Conti. Roman, Hallwag, Bern 1941
 Victoire oder Die letzte Rose. Roman, Steinberg, Zürich 1946
 Reflets (Gedichte), écrivains réunis, Lyon 1956
 Raum ohne Kehrreim / Espace sans refrain. Gedichte. Mit drei Scherenschnitten von Hans Arp, Tschudy (Die Quadrat-Bücher 23), St. Gallen 1961
 Traumschalmei. Göttinnen – Einkehr – Der Stylit. Gedichte, Karlsruher Bote, Karlsruhe 1969
 Tagebuch aus Israel. Gedichte, Karlsruher Bote, Karlsruhe 1970
 Aussagen. Gedichte, Karlsruher Bote, Karlsruhe 1971
 Vers et revers (Gedichte), Latvia, o.O. 1978
 Die Silberflöte. Zwei psychologische Tessiner Novellen, Sisyphos, Zürich 1980
 Dorf an der Grenze, Limmat, Zürich 1982

References

Swiss writers
Swiss psychoanalysts
Swiss pianists
Swiss women pianists
1889 births
1986 deaths
People from Vevey
20th-century pianists
20th-century women pianists